Heart Machine is an American independent video game development studio founded by Alx Preston. The studio is best known for developing Hyper Light Drifter (2016) and Solar Ash (2021).

History
The studio was founded by Preston in 2013 to support development of Hyper Light Drifter, a game that he was leading the development of during a crowdfunding campaign. The name Heart Machine draws from various medical conditions related to congenital heart disease that Preston had suffered and which were also inspirations for Hyper Light Drifter.

With Hyper Light Drifter far exceeding its crowdfunding goals, Preston established Heart Machine in Glitch Space, an open co-operative office area he had previously helped establish in Culver City, California for other independent developers. Hyper Light Drifter was released in 2016 to generally positive reviews and received several gaming award nominations.

The studio announced its next title, Solar Ash, in March 2019, to be published on Windows by Annapurna Interactive. According to Preston, the studio had been working on Solar Ash for some time after finishing up release on Hyper Light Drifter, and the new game includes "a whole new set of incredible tech and key innovations".  It is said to be set in the same universe as Hyper Light Drifter but is not a direct sequel to that game. Alx Preston is once again acting as the main designer, with Zoë Quinn writing for the narrative. Rich Vreeland (Disasterpeace) is slated to return to compose music for it. For the new game, Heart Machine has decided to abandon the 2D pixel art style and instead opt for a more open 3D world with a third-person camera view of the player character, although they have tried to retain the original game world's aesthetic and translated it to the new style. Preston has said that console releases are in the works as well. An introduction trailer was revealed in June 2020 at the PS5 digital showcase. The game was released on December 2, 2021.

On March 31st 2022 Heart Machine revealed their next game Hyper Light Breaker, set to release in 2023.
The soundtrack is expected to be handled by the studio's audio team and Disasterpeace isn't set to return this time around.

Games

References

External links
 

American companies established in 2013
Video game companies established in 2013
Video game companies of the United States
Companies based in Culver City, California
Video game development companies
2013 establishments in California
Indie video game developers